The Women's 400 metre freestyle competition of the 2022 FINA World Swimming Championships (25 m) was held on 13 December 2022.

Records
Prior to the competition, the existing world and championship records were as follows.

Results

Heats
The heats were started at 11:05.

Final
The final was held at 19:35.

References

Women's 400 metre freestyle
2022 in women's swimming